Trichilia lovettii is a species of plant in the family Meliaceae. It is endemic to Tanzania.

References

Flora of Tanzania
lovettii
Vulnerable plants
Taxonomy articles created by Polbot
Taxa named by Martin Cheek